Roberto Tomassini (born 2 August 1962) is a Sammarinese former cyclist. He competed in the individual road race at the 1980 Summer Olympics.

References

External links
 

1962 births
Living people
Sammarinese male cyclists
Olympic cyclists of San Marino
Cyclists at the 1980 Summer Olympics